Railway High School, Palakkad is a high school located in Palakkad city, Kerala, India.This is the only school in the state which is undertaken by Southern Railway.

History 
The school was started by Indian Railways as a primary school, under an unaided programme of the government of Kerala.

In 1979, with the initiative of the Headmaster Mr P Madhavan along with the Parent Teacher Association took up the issue of upgrading the school to a middle school. Due to lack of response from the State Government Authority, the Headmaster started 5th standard. Once the students of 5th standard passed the final exams, he started 6th class and so on to 10th standard.

Except for one student, all the students had taken the transfer Certificate and had joined schools like PMG, St Thomas Higher Secondary School, while Prathapan PP continued in the school. The recognition from state government was accorded in time, and the rest of the students came back.

The first batch of 10th standard students passed out in 1984. The school achieved a 100% pass mark by all the students of the first batch scoring pass mark in the final SSLC exam conducted by the government of Kerala. On 2 April 2006 almost all of the students from the first batch got together. During this event many of the school teachers were thanked. Several old students came from overseas to attend the function.

The school offers Malayalam and English divisions, and education up to class 12th[+2].

Closure of Railway Schools
In 2018, Indian Railways announced its intent to withdraw support for its Railway Schools after 2018–19. Later, it revised its position, announcing support for schools with fifteen to twenty wards of railway employees. Palakkad was one of these schools.

References

High schools and secondary schools in Kerala
Railway schools in India
Schools in Palakkad district